Catasetum discolor, the differently colored catasetum, is a species of orchid.

discolor
Plants described in 1835